Boana pugnax, the Chirique-Flusse tree frog, is a frog in the family Hylidae.  It is endemic to Panama, Colombia, and Venezuela.  Scientists have seen it as high as 500 meters above sea level.

References

Boana
Amphibians described in 1824
Amphibians of Brazil
Endemic fauna of Brazil